Hathor 12 - Coptic Calendar - Hathor 14

The thirteenth day of the Coptic month of Hathor, the third month of the Coptic year. On a common year, this day corresponds to November 9, of the Julian Calendar, and November 22, of the Gregorian Calendar. This day falls in the Coptic season of Peret, the season of emergence.

Commemorations

Saints 

 The martyrdom of Saint Theodore Tyro
 The departure of Pope Zacharias, the sixty-fourth Patriarch of the See of Saint Mark 
 The departure of Saint Timothy, the Bishop of Antinoe 
 The departure of Saint Joseph, in El Assas Mountain

Other commemorations 

 The commemoration of Archangel Gabriel

References 

Days of the Coptic calendar